Martin Marietta Center for the Performing Arts is the premier location for cultural arts and entertainment in Raleigh, North Carolina. The center consists of four unique venues, Raleigh Memorial Auditorium, Meymandi Concert Hall, A.J. Fletcher Opera Theater, and Kennedy Theatre.

The Martin Marietta Center for the Performing Arts hosts national tours and performers, and is also home to five resident companies; Carolina Ballet, NC Opera, NC Symphony, NC Theatre, and PineCone. Hosting over 600 events each year and welcoming over 400,000 guests, the Martin Marietta Center is a cultural focal point in downtown Raleigh.

The naming rights to the center currently are held by Martin Marietta. The building naming rights were previously held by Duke Energy (formerly Progress Energy), and by Business Telecom, Inc. (now EarthLink).

The center consists of:
 Raleigh Memorial Auditorium (opened 1932, renovated 1990)
 Meymandi Concert Hall (opened 2001)
 A. J. Fletcher Opera Theater (opened 2001)
 Kennedy Theatre (opened 2001)
 Lichtin Plaza (opened 2001)

Performance Venues and Facilities

Raleigh Memorial Auditorium 

Raleigh Memorial Auditorium opened in 1932 to replace the city's original 1912 City Auditorium, which burned in 1930. The auditorium's name commemorates Raleigh citizens who died serving their country during World War I.

Situated downtown at the southern end of Fayetteville Street, the Greek Revival structure is an architectural complement to the North Carolina State Capitol located a few blocks away at the northern terminus of the street. 

Raleigh Memorial Auditorium is the crown jewel of North Carolina performing arts. Over the years, this richly historic venue has played host to a dazzling array of artists. Sinatra, Jerry Seinfeld, Norah Jones, Alice in Chains, Chris Tucker, and Shreya Ghoshal have played the venue. Broadway blockbusters like Les Misérables, The Phantom of the Opera, Disney’s The Lion King, Jersey Boys, Miss Saigon, and Rent have also been staged here.

The venue has undergone several dramatic renovations ranging from 1975, 1990, 2001, and 2016, all enhancing the space to blend state-of-the-art technical amenities with traditional theatre traditions.

Meymandi Concert Hall 

The North Carolina Symphony calls this remarkable 1,587-seat venue home and it’s easy to see why. Its 65-ft ceiling, unique shoebox shape, narrow sides, shallow balconies and lack of proscenium all work together to deliver the warmest, clearest and most immersive sound experience possible. Meymandi Concert Hall has hosted national and international artists and performers such as; Dave Chapelle, Backstreet Boys, Merle Haggard, Carlos Mencia, Bryan Adams, and Aziz Ansari. Named for the mother of Raleigh physician and philanthropist Dr. Assad Meymandi, the facility has excellent acoustics.

Fletcher Opera Theater 

This intimate 600-seat theater offers a unique experience perfect for ballet, opera, concerts, and comedy with the farthest balcony seat less than 70 feet from the stage. Located on the east side of the Martin Marietta Center for the Performing Arts, this unique venue is home to the Carolina Ballet. A wide variety of other performers and guests have also graced the stage such as; Boney James, Post Modern Jukebox, Richa Sharma, Hannibal Buress, and Vice President Kamala Harris.

Kennedy Theatre 

With seating up to 150, our 40 x 60-foot black-box experimental theater fuses intimacy with energy and the deeply personal with the universal theatre experience. Kennedy Theatre provides performance and rehearsal space for many innovative groups. Regional theatre productions have been hosted here, as well as performances by Broadway performers such as Ariana Debose. This space is also the idea blank slate for video shoots, meetings, and corporate luncheons.

Lichtin Plaza 

Lichtin Plaza is the  lawn fronting the Martin Marietta Center for the Performing Arts. It often serves as a venue for outdoor festivals, as well as the site of public and private gatherings and tented events. The plaza is named for Harold Lichtin, a prominent regional commercial real estate developer.

Performance Groups and Organizations 

Organizations that regularly hold performances and concerts at the Martin Marietta Center include:
 Theatre In The Park
 North Carolina Opera
 Carolina Ballet
 North Carolina Theatre
 Pinecone, The Piedmont Council of Traditional Music
 North Carolina Symphony
 North Carolina Master Chorale
 Triangle Youth Orchestra, Triangle Youth Symphony, & Triangle Youth Philharmonic
 Raleigh Dance Theater
 Triangle Youth Brass Band
 The Raleigh Ringers

References

External links 

Website of the Martin Marietta Center for the Performing Arts

Dance in North Carolina
Music venues in North Carolina
Buildings and structures in Raleigh, North Carolina
Opera houses in North Carolina
Performing arts centers in North Carolina
Tourist attractions in Raleigh, North Carolina
Theatres in Raleigh, North Carolina